Narcetes is a genus of slickheads. It was formally described by Alfred William Alcock in 1890. It currently contains six described species. 

The generic name is from Greek νάρκη (narkē, "stingray" or "numbness") and -της (tēs, forming a masculine noun meaning, from a place).

Species
There are currently six recognized species in this genus:
 Narcetes erimelas Alcock, 1890
 Narcetes kamoharai Okamura, 1984
 Narcetes lloydi Fowler, 1934 (Lloyd's slickhead)
Narcetes shonanmaruae Poulsen, H. Ida, Kawato & Fujiwara, 2021 (Yokozuna slickhead)
 Narcetes stomias (C. H. Gilbert, 1890) (Blackhead salmon)
 Narcetes wonderi Herre, 1935

References

Alepocephalidae